Gamu, officially the Municipality of Gamu, is a 4th class municipality in the province of Isabela, Philippines. According to the 2020 census, it has a population of 30,655 people.

While not a commercially thriving town, it lies near the cities of Ilagan and Cauayan, communities with banks, hospitals, and places of entertainment. It is the site of the 5th Infantry Division  of Philippine Army as its infantry unit in Northern Luzon. The Infantry is located in Barangay Upi. The town itself is famous for its baroque church, which has pointed towers at its facade.

Etymology
Gamu was originally called 'Gamut', likely from a local plant whose roots were made into a type of medicine ('gamot').
From Fr. Jose Bugarin's Ibanag dictionary "Gamu-t, root or stump [name] a town whose patroness is St. Rosa de Lima, under of the province of Cagayan until the year 1839, when the province of N. Vizcaya was established, and was added to it."

Geography
Gamu is located in the central part of the province of Isabela.  It is approximately 10 kilometers away from the provincial capitol of Isabela and about 387 kilometers from the country's capital, Manila.

It is bounded on the north by the city of Ilagan, or the north-west by the municipality of Quirino, on the south by the municipality of Reina Mercedes and on the south-west by the municipality of Burgos, and on the Southeast by the municipality of Naguilian.

Gamu has a total land area of 129.40 square kilometers with 16 barangays, 3 of which are classified as urban barangays, District I, II and III, and the rests are considered rural barangays.

Barangays
Gamu is politically subdivided into 16 barangays. These barangays are headed by elected officials: Barangay Captain, Barangay Council, whose members are called Barangay Councilors. All are elected every three years.

District I, II, and III are considered as urban barangays while the rest are rural.
 Barcolan
 Buenavista
 Dammao
 District I (Poblacion)
 District II (Poblacion)
 District III (Poblacion)
 Furao
 Guibang
 Lenzon
 Linglingay
 Mabini
 Pintor
 Rizal
 Songsong
 Union
 Upi

Climate

Demographics

Economy

Culture
The town celebrated the Kuliglig Festival on August 23, 2013, following an executive order issued by the municipal government to officially proclaim it as the official festivity of the town.

Tourism

The town of Gamu is notable for having the most number of Roman Catholic churches in the entire province of Isabela. These churches are often visited by pilgrims and frequented by travellers all over the country to pay homage to each of the respective Roman Catholic icons to whom each of the churches were dedicated and named after.

The National Shrine of Our Lady of the Visitation of Guibang was elevated into a National Shrine in 1986 by the Catholic Bishops Conference of the Philippines (CBCP) through the initiative of the late Most Rev. Miguel Purugganan, then Bishop of the Diocese of Ilagan. It is where the Marian image of the Our Lady of the Visitation of Guibang is enshrined.
The Cathedral of Saint Michael the Archangel is located along the National Highway in Barangay Upi. It is where the episcopal seat of the Roman Catholic Diocese of Ilagan is located since 2013, when it was transferred from Saint Ferdinand Cathedral in Ilagan City, Isabela.
The Poor Clare Monastery in Barangay Guibang is a church and monastery that was built and dedicated to Saint Clare of Assisi. It was established in 1991 by the Poor Clare nuns from Cabuyao in the province of Laguna through the assistance of the Roman Catholic Diocese of Ilagan and help from civic-minded benefactors.
The Saint Rose of Lima Church is a Baroque-style 18th century structure dedicated to the town's patron saint, Saint Rose of Lima. It is notably the oldest church in the town and one of the only remaining churches of its kind in the province of Isabela.

Government

Local government
The municipality is governed by a mayor designated as its local chief executive and by a municipal council as its legislative body in accordance with the Local Government Code. The mayor, vice mayor, and the councilors are elected directly by the people through an election which is being held every three years.

Elected officials

Congress representation
Gamu, belonging to the second legislative district of the province of Isabela, currently represented by Hon. Ed Christopher S. Go.

Education
The Schools Division of Isabela governs the town's public education system. The division office is a field office of the DepEd in Cagayan Valley region. The office governs the public and private elementary and public and private high schools throughout the municipality.

References

External links
Municipal Profile at the National Competitiveness Council of the Philippines 
Gamu at the Isabela Government Website
Local Governance Performance Management System
[ Philippine Standard Geographic Code]
Philippine Census Information
Municipality of Gamu

Municipalities of Isabela (province)
Populated places on the Rio Grande de Cagayan